"The Promise Man" is a 1993 song by Swedish band Basic Element featuring vocalist Zetma Prembo, released as the second single from their first album, Basic Injection (1994). It is one of their most successful songs and a big hit in Scandinavia, peaking at number three in Sweden, staying within the chart for 16 weeks. It also topped the Swedish national radio P3 Tracks chart and was one of the most played songs on radio. In Denmark and Finland, it peaked at number six, and on the Eurochart Hot 100, it reached a respectable number 33 in April 1994. The album included two different versions of the song, including the Rob & JJ Euroclub Mix.

Single track listing

Charts

Weekly charts

Year-end charts

References

 

1993 songs
1993 singles
1994 singles
English-language Swedish songs
EMI Records singles
Eurodance songs